34 (thirty-four) is the natural number following 33 and preceding 35.

In mathematics
34 is the ninth distinct semiprime and has four divisors including one and itself. Its neighbors, 33 and 35, also are distinct semiprimes, having four divisors each, and 34 is the smallest number to be surrounded by numbers with the same number of divisors as it has.

It is the ninth Fibonacci number and a companion Pell number. Since it is an odd-indexed Fibonacci number, 34 is a Markov number, appearing in solutions with other Fibonacci numbers, such as (1, 13, 34), (1, 34, 89), etc.

34 is the magic constant of a 4 by 4 normal magic square:

This number is also the magic constant of n-Queens Problem for n = 4.

34 is a heptagonal number.

There are 34 topologically distinct convex heptahedra, excluding mirror images.

There is no solution to the equation φ(x) = 34, making 34 a nontotient. Nor is there a solution to the equation x − φ(x) = 34, making 34 a noncototient.

It is an Erdős–Woods number.

In science
The atomic number of selenium
Potentially one of the magic numbers in physics.
Messier object M34, a magnitude 6.0 open cluster in the constellation Perseus
The New General Catalogue object NGC 34, a peculiar galaxy in the constellation Cetus
The vertebral column is made up of up to 34 vertebrae.

Literature

 In The Count of Monte Cristo, Number 34 is how Edmond Dantès is referred to during his imprisonment in the Château d'If.

Transportation
 34th Street (Manhattan), a major cross-town street in New York City
 34th Street (New York City Subway), multiple New York City subway stations

In other fields
34 is also:
The traffic code of Istanbul, Turkey
 "#34", a song by the Dave Matthews Band
The number of the French department Hérault
+34 is the code for international direct-dial phone calls to Spain
 The number used to win the 2021 Daytona 500 with Michael McDowell and Front Row Motorsports. The number and team also won at Pocono Raceway with Chris Buescher and Talladega Superspeedway with David Ragan. In 1961, Wendell Scott won with the number to become the first African American to win in NASCAR.

See also
Rule 34

References

External links

 Prime Curios! 34 from the Prime Pages

Integers